Cleveland Mall may refer to:
The Mall (Cleveland), a public park in Cleveland, Ohio.
Cleveland Mall (North Carolina), a shopping mall in Shelby, North Carolina.
Cleveland Mall, a former shopping mall in Cleveland, Tennessee, predecessor of the Bradley Square Mall.